Østre Grimevann or Austre Grimevannet is a lake in the municipality of Lillesand in Agder county, Norway. It is the drinking water reservoir for the municipality of Lillesand.

See also
List of lakes in Aust-Agder
List of lakes in Norway

References

Lakes of Agder
Lillesand